Albert Jean Michel de Rocca (1788 – 31 January 1818) was a French lieutenant during the Napoleonic Wars.  He was also the second husband of Anne Louise Germaine de Staël.

Biography
De Rocca was born in Geneva, Republic of Geneva, in 1788. He served in the French army during the Peninsular war and was seriously injured. After returning to Geneva, he had an affair with Germaine de Staël, who, exiled from Paris by Napoleon, lived in her castle at nearby Coppet. The lady bore a son on 7 April 1812, whose father legitimated as Louis-Alphonse Rocca. They separated when Madame de Staël started on a European tour, to reach London through Vienna, Moscow, St. Petersburg and Stockholm. Later they married and moved together to Paris after Waterloo and Napoleon's second abdication. On 5 January 1817 Germaine de Staël suffered a seizure left her paralysed. De Staël subsequently died on 14 July 1817, soon followed by de Rocca, who died in Hyères on 31 January 1818.

De Rocca left two descriptions of the military events in which he was involved: "Mémoire sur la guerre des Français en Espagne" and "La campagne de Walcheren et d'Anvers" (a failed landing by the British in Kingdom of Holland and Belgium)".

His son Louis-Alphonse married Marie Louise Barthelot de Rambuteau, daughter of Claude-Philibert Barthelot, comte de Rambuteau.

Sources

 André Palluel-Guillard, L'aigle et la croix : Genève et la Savoie, 1798-1815, Yens-sur-Morges, Éditions Cabedita, 1999, 662 pages, p. 618 [archive].
 J. Christopher Herold, Mistress to an Age : A Life of Madame de Stael, Grove Press, 2002, 512 pages.
 Pauline Laure Marie de Broglie Pange, Le dernier amour de Madame de Staël d'après des documents inédits, Genève, La Palatine, 1944, 255 pages, p. 159.

External links
 http://viaf.org/viaf/107596338/
 http://catalogue.bnf.fr/ark:/12148/cb13007161r
 http://www.idref.fr/076577805
 http://id.loc.gov/authorities/names/no99017606.html
 https://portal.dnb.de/opac.htm?method=simpleSearch&cqlMode=true&query=idn%3D140897003
 http://www.worldcat.org/identities/lccn-no99-017606/

Military personnel from the Republic of Geneva
French military personnel of the Napoleonic Wars
1788 births
1818 deaths